Achanak (translation: Suddenly) is a 1973 Indian Hindi film, directed by Gulzar, written by Khwaja Ahmad Abbas, and starring Vinod Khanna. Gulzar received a Filmfare nomination as Best Director for this film. Even though Gulzar is an accomplished lyricist, this film did not have any songs in it. K.A. Abbas earned a Filmfare nomination for best story.  It is inspired by the real-life sensational 1958 murder case KM Nanavati v State of Maharashtra.

1963 movie Yeh Rastey Hain Pyar Ke was also based on the same case. Akshay Kumar starrer 2016 movie Rustom is based on the same case as well.

The film had no songs, the background score is composed by Vasant Desai.

Plot
Major Ranjeet Khanna is in love with his wife Pushpa, who seems to love him as well.  His commanding officer, also his father-in-law Lt Col Bakshi.  Ranjeet is happy with his marriage, until he finds out about his wife's affair with his best friend.  He kills them both and turns himself in to the police.  Then, he escapes from the police to find the Ganges River, because he wanted to fulfill his wife's wish of dropping her wedding necklace (mangalsutra) into the river.  However, the police shoot him first and he is hospitalized, where he becomes emotionally attached to the doctors and the nurse, who are also devastated when he is sentenced to hang to death.

Cast

Production

The entire film production was completed in 28 days. Achanak was based on a Khwaja Ahmed Abbas story, The Thirteenth Victim, which had appeared in the magazine called Imprint. In 1973 N.C Sippy's sons, Romu Sippy and Raj Sippy collaborated with partner Hrishikesh Mukherjee to produce Achanak and they approached Gulzar to direct it. Gulzar approached Vasantrao, a marathi background score composer to compose the score for this film since it would have no songs otherwise.

Soundtrack
Background music was composed by Vasant Desai.

References

External links 

1973 films
1970s Hindi-language films
Films directed by Gulzar
Films with screenplays by Khwaja Ahmad Abbas